Shawmut is an unincorporated village in the town of Fairfield, Somerset County, Maine, United States. Shawmut has a post office with ZIP code 04975.

References

Villages in Somerset County, Maine
Villages in Maine